Ellen Davis is executive vice president of industry engagement at the Consumer Brands Association. Previously, she served as president of the NRF Foundation and senior vice president of strategic initiatives at the National Retail Federation.

She coined the phrase "Cyber Monday," now considered the official kickoff of the online holiday shopping season, and has appeared frequently on broadcast news programs including Fox News, CNBC, CNN and ABC News.

Davis was born in Galesburg, Illinois.

Education 
She holds a bachelor's degree in communications from Millikin University and holds a master's degree in business administration from the Georgetown University McDonough School of Business.

Career 
Davis joined NRF in 2002 as manager of media relations before assuming her current roles. Since becoming president of the NRF Foundation in 2012, Davis launched the annual NRF Foundation Gala, formed the NRF Talent Acquisition Group of human resources executives from retailers, and led the creation of the Foundation's "RISE Up" training and credentialing program. She then left NRF in January 2020.

Awards & honors 
In 2007, Davis was named in the "15 to Watch" by PR NewsChannel. Fast Company covered Davis in their "Most Creative People" series in 2015 and Poets&Quants for Executives chose her as one of the "Best and Brightest EMBAs of 2016."

References

Living people
American women in business
Millikin University alumni
People from Galesburg, Illinois
Year of birth missing (living people)
21st-century American businesswomen
21st-century American businesspeople